Ghana competed in the 2008 Summer Olympics held in Beijing, People's Republic of China from August 8 to August 24, 2008.

Athletics 

Men

Women

Key
Note–Ranks given for track events are within the athlete's heat only
Q = Qualified for the next round
q = Qualified for the next round as a fastest loser or, in field events, by position without achieving the qualifying target
NR = National record
N/A = Round not applicable for the event
Bye = Athlete not required to compete in round

Boxing

Ghana qualified six boxers for the Olympic boxing tournament. Manyo Plange and Ahmed Saraku qualified at the first African qualifying tournament. The other four Ghanaian boxers qualified at the second African continental qualifying tournament.

External links
 The line-up of Ghanaian contingent at the games.

References

Nations at the 2008 Summer Olympics
2008
Summer Olympics